Trotman is a surname. Notable people with the surname include:

 Alexander Trotman, Baron Trotman (1933–2005), Ford Motor Company's first foreign-born chairman and CEO
 David Trotman (born 1951), mathematician, with dual British and French nationality
 Dawson Trotman (1906–1956), evangelist, crusader and founder of The Navigators
 Ebenezer Trotman (died 1865), architect of churches and railway stations
 Emmerson Trotman (born 1954), former West Indies cricketer who played for the Rebel West Indies side in South Africa
 James Trotman (born 1979), British tennis player who retired early from tennis due to ongoing injuries
 Lloyd Trotman (1923–2007), jazz bassist born in Boston who backed numerous jazz, dixieland, doo-wop and R&B artists
 Mickey Trotman (1974–2001), football player from Trinidad and Tobago
 Mildred T. Trotman, Mayor of the Borough of Princeton, New Jersey
 Neal Trotman (born 1987), English association footballer
 Raphael Trotman (born 1966), lawyer and a politician in Guyana

References 

English-language surnames